| lowest attendance   = 267Ealing v Nottingham2 February 2019
| tries               = {{#expr: 

 9 + 5 + 1 + 10 + 6 + 4
 + 3 + 11 + 6 + 7 + 8 + 11
 + 6 + 12 + 8 + 10 + 9 + 5
 + 9 + 4 + 7 + 7 + 9 + 7 
 + 8 + 6 + 3 + 1 + 7 + 10
 + 5 + 3 + 5 + 2 + 4 + 4
 + 3 + 6 + 5 + 8
 + 4 + 13
 
}}
| top point scorer    =  Javier Rojas Alvarez(Cornish Pirates)65 points
| top try scorer      =  Jack Macfarlane(Jersey Reds) Jordan Burns(Ealing Trailfinders)8 tries each
| venue               = Trailfinders Sports Ground
| attendance2         = 3,627
| champions           = Ealing Trailfinders
| count               = 1
| runner-up           = London Irish
| website             = 
| previous year       = 
| next year           = 2019–20
}}

The 2018–19 RFU Championship Cup was the inaugural season of the annual rugby union Championship Cup competition for second tier, professional English clubs playing in the RFU Championship. It was formed following the discontinuation of the British and Irish Cup at the end of the 2017–18 season.

The inaugural winners were Ealing Trailfinders who defeated London Irish 23–17 in the final held at the Trailfinders Sports Ground. It was a deserved victory for Ealing, who were the best side in the competition, and was their second win in a cup competition in two seasons, having won the British and Irish Cup the previous season. Runner-up London Irish, who had won the Championship league title a few weeks earlier, missed out on a notable double.

Competition format
The competition format was a group stage followed by a knockout stage. The group stage consisted of three (roughly) regional groups of four teams each playing home and away matches. Group matches ran for six consecutive weeks from November through to December following a break in the RFU Championship league campaign.

The top two sides in each group, plus the two best third-placed teams, progressed to the knockout stage, with the best ranked sides receiving home advantage in the quarter-finals. The four winning quarter-finalists progressed to the semi-finals with the winners playing in the final in May 2019.

Participating teams and locations

Group stage

Group 1 (North)

Round 1

Round 2

Round 3

Round 4

Round 5

Round 6

Group 2 (London & South East)

Round 1

Round 2

Round 3

Round 4

Round 5

Round 6

Group 3 (South West & Midlands)

Round 1

Round 2

Round 3

Round 4

Round 5

Round 6

Knock-out stage
The eight qualifiers were seeded according to performance in the pool stage - with the three pool winners making the top three seeds along with the best runner-up as seed number 4, and the next two runners-up and two best 3rd-placed teams making up the other four seeds. The top four seeds hosted the quarter-finals against the lower seeds, in a 1 v 8, 2 v 7, 3 v 6, 4 v 5 format. However, if two teams qualified from the same pool they could not be drawn together.

Teams were ranked by:
1 – competition points (4 for a win, 2 for a draw)
2 – where competition points are equal, greatest number of wins
3 – where the number of wins are equal, greatest number of tries scored
4 – where the number of tries are equal, aggregate points difference
5 – where the aggregate points difference are equal, greatest number of points scored
6 – where the greatest number of points are equal, least red cards
7 – if red cards are equal, then ranking will be decided by the toss of a coin

Quarter-finals

Semi-finals

Final

Attendances

Individual statistics
 Points scorers includes tries as well as conversions, penalties and drop goals. Appearance figures also include coming on as substitutes (unused substitutes not included).

Top points scorers

Top try scorers

Season records

Team
Largest home win — 54 points
59 – 5 London Irish at home to Hartpury College on 9 December 2018
Largest away win — 31 points
38 – 7 Jersey Reds away to Richmond on 1 December 2018
Most points scored — 64 
64 – 17 London Irish at home to Cornish Pirates on 18 November 2018
Most tries in a match — 9 (3)
London Irish at home to Cornish Pirates on 18 November 2018
London Irish at home to Hartpury College on 9 December 2018
Ealing Trailfinders at home to Cornish Pirates on 24 February 2019
Most conversions in a match — 7 (2)
London Irish at home to Cornish Pirates on 18 November 2018
London Irish at home to Hartpury College on 9 December 2018
Most penalties in a match — 5
Cornish Pirates at home to Bedford Blues on 11 November 2018
Most drop goals in a match — 1
Jersey Reds at home to Ealing Trailfinders on 8 December 2018

Player
Most points in a match — 20 (2)
 Jack Macfarlane for Jersey Reds at home to Richmond on 24 November 2018 
 Jordan Burns for Ealing Trailfinders at home to Cornish Pirates on 24 February 2019
Most tries in a match — 4 (2)
 Jack Macfarlane for Jersey Reds at home to Richmond on 24 November 2018
 Jordan Burns for Ealing Trailfinders at home to Cornish Pirates on 24 February 2019
Most conversions in a match — 7
 Jacob Atkins for London Irish at home to Hartpury College on 9 December 2018
Most penalties in a match — 5
 Javier Rojas Alvarez for Cornish Pirates at home to Bedford Blues on 11 November 2018
Most drop goals in a match — 1
 Aaron Penberthy for Jersey Reds at home to Ealing Trailfinders on 8 December 2018

Attendances
Highest — 3,627
Ealing Trailfinders at home to London Irish on 4 May 2019
Lowest — 267
Ealing Trailfinders at home to Nottingham on 2 February 2019
Highest average attendance — 2,147
Bedford Blues
Lowest average attendance — 506
Yorkshire Carnegie

Notes

See also
 RFU Championship
 British and Irish Cup
 2018–19 Premiership Rugby Cup
 English rugby union system
 List of English rugby union teams
 Rugby union in England

References

External links
 RFU

RFU Championship Cup
2018–19 rugby union tournaments for clubs
2018–19 RFU Championship